Kevin Zabo (born December 5, 1995) is a Canadian professional basketball player for the CB Ciudad de Ponferrada of the LEB Plata. He completed his college basketball career with Kent State.

Early life 
Zabo was born in Sherbrooke, Quebec to Congolese father Ndavo Zeph Zabo and Rwandan mother Jackie Mukamayire. His parents and older brother Alexandre had settled in Canada in the 1990s to escape a brewing war in central Africa. At age 4, Zabo moved to Gatineau, Quebec, and at age 5, he began playing basketball against older opponents in a YMCA league. He played for De L'Île High School by 7th grade and was also a member of Amateur Athletic Union (AAU) team QC United.

High school career 
When he was 15 years old, Zabo started living in the United States, away from his family, for high school. He first attended St. Mark's School in Southborough, Massachusetts, where he was teammates with college prospects Nik Stauskas, Alex Murphy, and Kaleb Tarczewski. With St. Mark's, Zabo was ranked among the top guards in his class by ESPN. However, he decided to transfer due to the school's requirement of playing multiple sports, which forced him to play football. As a sophomore, he attended Montrose Christian School in Rockville, Maryland but left after one year over housing concerns.

Zabo completed his high school career at Brewster Academy in Wolfeboro, New Hampshire, where he joined several NCAA Division I recruits, including Devonte' Graham and Chris McCullough. In the 2013–14 season, he helped his team finish with a 33–2 record and win the National Prep Championship and New England Preparatory School Athletic Council Class AAA title. Zabo was rated a three-star recruit by recruiting service 247Sports and ESPN. He played with CIA Bounce on the AAU circuit, a team that featured Anthony Bennett and Andrew Wiggins, who would both become first overall NBA draft picks.

College career
Zabo joined a San Diego State team that was coming off a 31–5 season, and he was logging productive minutes during the nonconference season. However, after spraining his pinky toe, Zabo had trouble finding his spot in the rotation. He opted to transfer following the season. Zabo played a season at Indian Hills Community College, averaging seven points per game and attracting the attention of Division I coaches. He narrowed down his choices to Wichita State, Memphis and Iona. However, Wichita State ran out of scholarships, Memphis lost its coaching staff and Iona signed another point guard. Kent State head coach Rob Senderoff had seen Zabo play at Indian Hills while recruiting his teammate Jerrelle DeBerry, and the Golden Flashes were losing starting point guard Kellon Thomas to transfer, so Senderoff offered Zabo a scholarship.

He committed to Kent State, and helped lead the team to the 2017 NCAA Tournament as a junior. He posted 5.6 points per game on the season. On January 12, 2018, Zabo scored a career-high 24 points and hit four three-pointers in a 70–69 win over Ohio. The following game, Zabo scored 23 points in a 73–71 win over Western Michigan. As a senior at Kent State, Zabo averaged 13 points, 3.2 rebounds, 2.4 assists per game and shot 42.1% from the field.

Professional career
After completing his collegiate eligibility, Zabo participated in the inaugural Dos Equis 3X3U National Championship.

St. John's Edge (2018) 
On August 2, 2018, Zabo signed a one-year deal with the St. John's Edge of the NBL Canada.

Albacete Basket (2018–2019) 
On January 14, 2019, Zabo signed for the remainder of the season with the Albacete Basket of the LEB Plata.

CB Ciudad de Ponferrada (2019–present) 
On August 12, 2019, Zabo signed a one-year deal with the CB Ciudad de Ponferrada of the LEB Plata.

References 

1995 births
Living people
Basketball people from Quebec
Canadian expatriate basketball people in Spain
Amateur Athletic Union men's basketball players
Canadian expatriate basketball people in the United States
Canadian men's basketball players
Indian Hills Warriors basketball players
Kent State Golden Flashes men's basketball players
Point guards
San Diego State Aztecs men's basketball players
Sportspeople from Sherbrooke
St. John's Edge players